This list of churches in Helsingør Municipality lists church buildings in Helsingør Municipality, Denmark.

Church of Denmark

Other

See also
 Listed buildings in Helsingør Municipality

References

External links

 Nordens kirker: Nordsjælland

 
Helsingor